The 1994 Source Awards was held at the Paramount Theater in New York City, New York on April 25, 1994.

Winners and nominees
Winners are in bold text.

Artist of the Year (group)
 A Tribe Called Quest

Artist of the Year (solo)
 Dr. Dre

New Artist of the Year (group)
 Wu-Tang Clan

New Artist of the Year (solo)
 Snoop Doggy Dogg

Lyricist of the Year (group or solo)
 Snoop Doggy Dogg

Album of the Year
 Dr. Dre – The Chronic

Single of the Year
 Wu-Tang Clan – Method Man

Rap Album of the Year
 Dr. Dre – The Chronic

Motion Picture Soundtrack of the Year
 Menace II Society

Acting Performance, Movie or TV
 MC Eiht – Menace II Society

R&B Artist of the Year
 Mary J. Blige

Producer of the Year
 Dr. Dre

Dancehall Artist of the Year
 Buju Banton

Live Performer of the Year (group or solo)
 KRS-One

Video of the Year
 Ice Cube – Check Yo Self

Performances
 Onyx – "Throw Ya Gunz"
 Thug Life – "Out on Bail"
 Wu-Tang Clan – "C.R.E.A.M."
 Run DMC - "Sucker MC's"

References

The Source Awards, 1994
1994 in American music
1994 awards in the United States
1994 in New York City